Andrew Douglas Rankine (14 March 1895 – 13 September 1965) was a Scottish professional footballer who played as an inside left in the Scottish League for Aberdeen and Cowdenbeath.

Career statistics

Honours 
Aberdeen

 Fleming Charity Shield: 1923

Individual

Cowdenbeath Hall of Fame

References 

Scottish footballers
Cowdenbeath F.C. players
Scottish Football League players
1965 deaths
Footballers from Aberdeenshire
Association football inside forwards
Association football wing halves
Banks O' Dee F.C. players
Indiana Flooring players
Bethlehem Steel F.C. (1907–1930) players
Scottish expatriate footballers
American Soccer League (1921–1933) players
Expatriate soccer players in the United States
1895 births
Keith F.C. players
Aberdeen F.C. players
Scottish expatriate sportspeople in the United States
Scottish Junior Football Association players
Highland Football League players